Tang Tian (born ; ）is a Chinese songwriter.  Her notable works include: "唱得响亮", "追光者", "体面", A Lifelong Journey, . In 2012, she was diagnosed with third stage of nasopharynx cancer.

In November 2021, Eason Chan released a song, as the Chinese soundtrack to the television series, Arcane: League of Legends. The song was written by Tang, who drew on her experience overcoming the cancer prognosis. It would become one of the most popular songs in China in the remaining months of 2021 through to 2022, when it was being nominated as one of the songs to be played during the semi-finals of 2022 FIFA World Cup in December 2022.

In 2022, she won the Best Lyrics award at Chinese Top Ten Music Awards. In January 2023, she was awarded the Lyricist Award at the 2022 Weibo Music Festival.

References 

1983 births
Living people
Chinese women musicians
Chinese lyricists